Eight Carat (GB) (1975–2000) was a British-bred Thoroughbred broodmare. in Australasia. She produced five individual Group One winners, including Octagonal, Mouawad, Kaapstad, Diamond Lover and (Our) Marquise who had 28 stakes wins between them.

Background
Eight Carat was a black or brown mare bred in Britain. She was sired by the Eclipse Stakes winner Pieces of Eight out of Klairessa. Klairessa had little success as a racehorse, but was a sister to both the King's Stand Stakes winner D'Urberville and the mare Lora who produced the 1000 Guineas winner On the House. In addition to Eight Carat, Klairessa also produced a colt by General Assembly named Knesset, who won the Ballyogan Stakes in 1988 and Habibti, the British champion sprinter and Horse of the Year in 1983.

Racing career
Eight Carat raced for three seasons in England in the late 1970s but showed no discernible ability, failing to win in five races. She was sold for 9,400 guineas in December 1979.

Breeding record
During her career as a broodmare, Eight Carat produced five Group One winners:
Diamond Lover (1982, by Sticks and Stones), won Railway Stakes (New Zealand)
Kaapstad (1984, by Sir Tristram), won VRC Sires Produce Stakes
Marquise (1991, by Gold and Ivory), won Captain Cook Stakes
Octagonal (1992, by Zabeel), won ten Group Ones including Cox Plate, Chipping Norton Stakes
Mouawad (1993, by Zabeel), won George Ryder Stakes, Futurity Stakes (Australia), Australian Guineas

Daughters as broodmares 
Her influence now extends to several generations and includes her daughters:

 Diamond Lover: dam of Tristalove winner of 2 Group 1 races and Champion Race filly; Don Eduardo winner of the Group 1 AJC Derby; Peruzzi multiple Group winner and Antwerp multiple Listed winner. Diamond Lover is the grand dam of Viscount (Multiple Group 1 winner and Champion 2YO); Helsinborg (Listed winner); Viking Ruler (Group 1 winner); Kempinsky (Group 2 winner); and Diamond Like (Listed winner). She is also the great grand dam of Lucida (Listed winner).  Lastly, she is the great-grand dam of De Beers (Group 1 winner).

 Marquise: dam of Shower of Roses, Group 1 winner.

 Cotehele House (1980 by My Swanee): dam of Danewin (b. 1991), winner of 5 Group 1 races, and Champion, 3YO of his year, and Commands, the winner of a Group 3 race. Both Danewin and Commands are now at stud in Australia's Hunter Valley. Both have been successful siring Group 1 winners, including (Danewin): Elegant Fashion, Vitesse Dane, County Tyrone, Excites and Toulouse-Lautrec; and (Commands): Undue and Paratroopers. Cotehele House is the grand dam of Emerald Dream (Group 1 winner); Special Bond (Listed winner) and Taimana (Group 2 winner). She is also the great grand dam of Impaler (2x Group 2 winner) and Listen Here (Listed winner).Cotehele House is the great-great grand dam of the 2020 Caulfield Cup and 2021 Melbourne Cup winner Verry Elleegant.

 La Brillante (1986 by Sir Tristram): dam of Philidor, Listed winner.

 Nine Carat (1989 by Sir Tristram): dam of Court of Jewels, Listed winner.

Sons as sires
Eight Carat's sons: Octagonal, Kaapstad, Colombia and Mouawad have all stood at stud.  

Octagonal is currently standing at Woodlands Stud, and will be best remembered as the sire of the two brothers: 
- Niello and 
- world champion miler of 2004, Lonhro (now also at stud at Woodlands). 

Kaapstad stood at Windsor Park Stud in New Zealand and was a leading sire and broodmare sire until his death on 9 May 2007.  

At stud Kaapstad sired 40 individual stakes winners.  

Colombia is currently standing in New Zealand at Newmarket Lodge. 

Mouawad stood one season in Australia at Glenlogan Park Stud in QLD, however due to fertility problems, he was re-sold again at public auction for A$525,000 to the former Domeland Syndicate and shipped to China.  Unfortunately his whereabouts are unknown due to the collapse of the Chinese racing industry in late 2005.

Honours
Eight Carat won the New Zealand Broodmare of the Year a record-equalling three times from 1995 to 1997 due to the deeds of Octagonal and Mouawad.

In 1996 Eight Carat was named Broodmare of the Year by the international journal Owner-Breeder (USA).

Eight Carat died in 2000, aged 25 at Sir Patrick Hogan's Cambridge Stud.  She is buried alongside Sir Tristram (IRE).

References

External links
 Stallion News: Eight Carat
 http://www.pedigreequery.com/eight+carat
 http://www.studbook.org.au
 http://www.ror.net.au
 https://web.archive.org/web/20070615131207/http://www.nzthoroughbred.co.nz/studs-stallions/stallions.aspx
 http://www.windsorpark.co.nz

1975 racehorse births
2000 racehorse deaths
Racehorses bred in the United Kingdom
Racehorses trained in the United Kingdom
Thoroughbred family 9-c
Blue Hen Broodmare